Caucasus Army (also Caucasian Army) or Russian Caucasus Army (also Russian Caucasian Army) can refer to several military formations:

Imperial Russian military formations

Russian Caucasus Forces (before 1865), a variety of formations with various names including (in 1857–1865) Caucasus Army
Caucasus Military District, the successor organization to this army
Russian Caucasus Army (World War I), the Russian army on the Caucasus front in World War I (July 1914 - April 1917)

Russian Republic military formation
Caucasus Front (Russian Republic), the successor organization to the Imperial Russian Caucasus Army

White Russian (anti-Bolshevik) military formation
Caucasus Volunteer Army, the name used for the White army in southern Russia during the Russian Civil War
Caucasus Army of VSUR, the name used for a separate White army, which operated between May 1919 and January 1920

Soviet military formations
11th Army (RSFSR) (1918–1921), formed October 3 1918 from the Northern Caucasus Army
Its successor, the Red Banner Caucasus Army (1921–1935), which was named the Independent Caucasus Army until August 1923
Its successor, the Transcaucasian Military District
Transcaucasian Front, a Soviet army group of World War II
Caucasus Front, a Soviet army group of World War II

Russian Federation military formation
North Caucasus Military District

See also
Caucasus Front, the name of various military organizations
Caucasus Army Group (Ottoman Empire), formed during World War I